= Luchtmacht =

Luchtmacht may refer to:

- Belgian Air Force
- Royal Netherlands Air Force
